Ulubari is a locality in center of Guwahati, surrounded by localities of Bhangagarh and Paltan Bazaar.

Sports facilities
The multipurpose Nehru Stadium is located here which hosts international cricket and football matches.

See also
 Basistha
 Chandmari
 Beltola

References

 

Neighbourhoods in Guwahati